St. Luke's Episcopal Church is a historic Episcopal church complex located at Brockport in Monroe County, New York. The complex consists of an 1855 Gothic Revival-style church of Medina sandstone and 1903 Romanesque style parish hall. The eastern chancel window features a tripartite composition executed in favrile glass by the Tiffany studios of New York. A second grouping of three Tiffany favrile glass windows is located on the western wall of the nave above the narthex.

It was listed on the National Register of Historic Places in 1990.

References

External links
St. Luke's Brockport

Brockport, New York
Churches on the National Register of Historic Places in New York (state)
Episcopal church buildings in New York (state)
Gothic Revival church buildings in New York (state)
Churches in Monroe County, New York
National Register of Historic Places in Monroe County, New York
Religious organizations established in 1838
Churches completed in 1855